Dwigubskyia togatus is a species of mite placed in its own family Dwigubskyiidae, in the order Mesostigmata.

References

Mesostigmata
Taxa named by Anthonie Cornelis Oudemans